Derek C. Stanford (born October 18, 1970) is an American statistician and politician serving as a member of the Washington State Senate, representing the 1st district since 2019. A member of the Democratic Party, he previously served as a member of the Washington House of Representatives from 2011 to 2019.

In July 2019, Stanford was appointed to the Washington Senate after previously serving in the Washington House of Representatives. He was appointed to complete the term of Guy Palumbo who resigned to lobby for Amazon. Stanford was replaced in the House by Bothell City Councilmember Davina Duerr.

References

1970 births
Living people
Democratic Party members of the Washington House of Representatives
21st-century American politicians
Democratic Party Washington (state) state senators